Family Therapy with Dr. Jenn is an American reality television series starring psychotherapist Dr. Jenn Mann and her staff. The series premiered on March 16, 2016, on VH1. Family Therapy is a spin-off of Couples Therapy, that chronicles famous families as they receive relationship counseling.

Cast

Main cast
Dr. Jenn
Dr. Christian Conte
Umeko Allen
Rachel Clark
Kami Storck

Families
April and Bam Margera
Briana and Brittany DeJesus
Dina and Michael Lohan
Bobby, Jeremy, and Damon Dash
Tiffany Pollard and Michelle "Sister" Patterson

Episodes

See also
 Couples Therapy

References

External links
 
 "Family Therapy with Dr. Jenn: Cast Bios"  VH1.com.
 

2010s American reality television series
2016 American television series debuts
2016 American television series endings
English-language television shows
Television shows set in Los Angeles
VH1 original programming
American television spin-offs
Reality television spin-offs